The 15 Year Old Girl is a 1989 French drama film directed by Jacques Doillon. The plot is about a teenage girl falling in love with father of her boyfriend. It was entered into the 16th Moscow International Film Festival.

Cast
 Judith Godrèche as Juliette
 Melvil Poupaud as Thomas
 Jacques Doillon as Willy

References

External links
 

1989 films
1989 crime drama films
French drama films
1980s French-language films
Films directed by Jacques Doillon
1980s French films